Singalong with Little Willie Littlefield is a studio album by American R&B and Boogie-woogie pianist and vocalist Little Willie Littlefield.

Content
The album was recorded in 1987 at The Farmsound Studio in Heelsum in the Netherlands and released in 1990 on the Dutch record label Oldie Blues (OLCD 7001). The album was produced by Job Zomer.

Track listing
 "Love Letters in the Sand"
 "Sentimental Journey"
 "On the Sunny Side of the Street"
 "Frankie and Johnny"
 "Don't Fence Me In"
 "Misty"
 "Pretty Brown Eyes"
 "What a Wonderful World"
 "Houston"
 "Looking Back"
 "Bad Bad Leroy Brown"
 "Mona Lisa"
 "Take These Chains from My Heart"
 "Moon Over Naples - Spanish Eyes"
 "When I Fall in Love"
 "Brahms' Lullaby"
 "Tennessee Waltz"
 "Blueberry Hill"

Personnel
 Little Willie Littlefield - piano, vocals
 Arthur Smit - keyboard bass, electric guitar
 Harry Noordhof - bass
 Job Zomer - clarinet, tenor sax, drums

References

External links
 Singalong With Little Willie Littlefield at Discogs
 

Little Willie Littlefield albums
Oldie Blues albums
1990 albums